German submarine U-176 was a Type IXC U-boat in Nazi Germany's Kriegsmarine during World War II.

Built at the DeSchiMAG AG Weser shipyard in Bremen, she was laid down on 6 February 1941, launched on 12 September and commissioned on 15 December, under the command of Kapitänleutnant Reiner Dierksen.

U-176 served with the 4. Unterseebootsflotille (U-boat flotilla) while training, and from 1 August 1942 with the 10th U-boat Flotilla, a long-range operations unit. U-176 completed three patrols, sinking 11 ships totalling  before she was sunk off Cayo Blanquizal by the Cuban Navy on 15 May 1943.

Design
German Type IXC submarines were slightly larger than the original Type IXBs. U-176 had a displacement of  when at the surface and  while submerged. She had two shafts and two  propellers.

U-176 was fitted with six  torpedo tubes (four fitted at the bow and two at the stern), 22 torpedoes, one  SK C/32 naval gun, 180 rounds, and a  SK C/30 as well as a  C/30 anti-aircraft gun. The boat had a complement of forty-eight.

Service history

First patrol
On 21 July 1942 U-176 sailed from Kiel, around the British Isles, and into the north Atlantic Ocean. She made her first kill on 4 August, sinking the unescorted 7,798 GRT British merchantman Richmond Castle with two torpedoes.

On 7 August she joined five other U-boats in reinforcing the eight boats of wolfpack Steinbrinck in a series of attacks on Convoy SC 94. On 8 August U-176 fired two salvoes of two torpedoes each at the convoy, sinking two British cargo ships, the 4,817 GRT Trehata and the 3,956 GRT Kelso, and the 7,914 GRT Greek cargo ship Mount Kassion. The next day she also sank another British ship, the 3,701 GRT Radchurch, which had been abandoned. The convoy escort was then reinforced by the Polish destroyer  and the British destroyer leader . Both ships were equipped with HF/DF (radio direction-finding equipment), which helped to keep the U-boats at bay until morning.

U-176 sank the 7,457 GRT British cargo ship  with two torpedoes on 25 August. The ship had been part of convoy ON 122; the U-boat ended the patrol after 74 days at sea at Lorient in France on 2 October 1942. The day after her return her captain was awarded the Iron Cross 1st Class.

Second patrol
U-176 departed Lorient on 9 November 1942 and headed into the south Atlantic. On 27 November she sank the 5,922 GRT Dutch merchant ship Polydorus after a 50-hour pursuit, the longest recorded by any U-boat in the Second World War.

Off Cape São Roque, Brazil, on 13 December 1942 the crew of U-176 boarded the 1,629 GRT Swedish cargo ship Scania, and sank her with scuttling charges after the crew had abandoned ship. On 16 December she sank the unescorted 5,881 GRT British cargo ship Observer with two torpedoes.

Prior to the sinking of Scania, a young seaman, Gottfrid Sundberg, surreptitiously photographed U-176 from Scania.

U-176 arrived back at Lorient on 18 February 1943 after a patrol lasting 102 days.

Third patrol
U-176 sailed for her third and final patrol on 6 April 1943 from Lorient, sailing across the Atlantic and into the Caribbean Sea. On 1 May, her commander was notified of his promotion to Korvettenkapitän.

On 13 May 1943, U-176 attacked Convoy NC 18 only five miles off the northern coast of Cuba, sinking the 2,249 GRT American tanker Nickeliner, which was loaded with 3,400 tons of ammonia water, and the 1,983 GRT Cuban molasses tanker Mambí.

Sinking

On 15 May, the Cuban merchant ship Camagüey, and the Honduran Hanks, both loaded with sugar, sailed from Sagua La Grande, bound for Havana, escorted by the Cuban submarine chasers CS-11, CS-12, and CS-13. CS-13 located the U-boat with her sonar, attacked with depth charges and sank U-176.

On 7 January 1944 K.Kapt.. Reiner Dierksen was posthumously awarded the Deutsches Kreuz in Gold.

CS-13 was commanded by the Cuban Navy's Alférez de Fragata, Mario Ramirez Delgado commanding, the only Cuban national to sink a U-boat during World War II. In 1946, Delgado, promoted to Lieutenant, was awarded the Orden del Mérito Naval con Distantivo Rojo (Meritorious Naval Service Order with Red Badge). Rear Admiral Samuel E. Morison, official historian of the US Navy, recognized his success in his work History of United States Naval Operations in World War II, where he also praised the ability and efficiency of the Cuban seamen.

Also present was Norberto Collado Abreu, who later found fame as the pilot of Granma, the yacht which brought Fidel Castro back to Cuba to restart the Cuban Revolution.

Wolfpacks
U-176 took part in two wolfpacks, namely:
 Steinbrinck (5 – 11 August 1942) 
 Lohs (11 August – 1 September 1942)

Summary of raiding history

References

Bibliography

External links

German Type IX submarines
U-boats commissioned in 1941
U-boats sunk in 1943
U-boats sunk by Cuban warships
1941 ships
World War II submarines of Germany
U-176
Ships built in Bremen (state)
U-boats sunk by depth charges
Battles involving Cuba
Maritime incidents in Cuba
Ships lost with all hands
Maritime incidents in May 1943